Łódź is a Polish parliamentary constituency in the Łódź Voivodeship.  It elects eleven members of the Sejm.

The district has the number '9' and is named after the city of Łódź.  It includes the county of Brzeziny and Łódź East and the city county of Łódź.

List of members

2019-2023

Footnotes

Electoral districts of Poland
Łódź
Łódź Voivodeship